Mattock is a surname. Notable people with the surname include:

 Joe Mattock (born 1990), English footballer
John Mattock, English rose grower
John Mattock (c.1571–1612), Archdeacon of Lewes
 Jon Mattock, English musician

Fictional characters:
 Lilly Mattock, fictional soap character